Rümlang is a railway station in the Swiss canton of Zurich and municipality of Rümlang. It is served by Zurich S-Bahn lines S9 and S15.

References

External links 
Rümlang station on Swiss Federal Railway's web site

Railway stations in the canton of Zürich
Swiss Federal Railways stations